Diwan Bahadur Sir Narasimha Gopalaswami Ayyangar  (31 March 1882 – 10 February 1953) was an Indian civil servant and statesman, who served as the Prime Minister of the princely state of Jammu and Kashmir and later a minister in the first cabinet of independent India. He was a member of the drafting committee of the Constitution of India, the leader of the Rajya Sabha, a 'minister without portfolio' looking after Kashmir Affairs, and the Minister for Railways.

In his Kashmir Affairs role, he represented India at the United Nations Security Council and later drafted the Article 370 of the Indian Constitution that granted autonomy to Jammu and Kashmir.

Early life and education
Gopalaswami Ayyangar was born on 31 March 1882 in Tanjore District Madras Presidency. He studied at the Wesley School, and at the Presidency and Law Colleges in Madras, whereafter, for a short period in 1904, he was an Assistant Professor in Pachaiyappa's College.

Career
In 1905, Ayyangar joined the Madras Civil Service. He served as a Deputy Collector till 1919, and was promoted Collector and District Magistrate in 1920. He was the Registrar-General of Panchayats and Inspector of Local Boards for seven years from 1921. During this time many villages panchayats were organized in the districts of Ramnad and Guntur. Then for three years, he was Collector and District Magistrate in Anantapur. Following that he was Inspector of Municipal Councils and Local Boards till 1932. Mr. Ayyangar served as Secretary to Government in the Public Works Department from 1932 to 1934. Finally, he served as a member of the Board of Revenue until 1937. The second phase of his career was devoted to politics. He was Prime Minister of Jammu and Kashmir from 1937-1943 and was appointed Council of State from 1943-1947. During that time he was Chairman of the Committee for the Indianisation of Army. From 1947-1948 he served as Minister without Portfolio in the first cabinet under Jawaharlal Nehru. This was followed by his sojourn as Minister of Railways and Transport from 1948-1952, and finally, he served as Defence Minister from 1952-1953.

Prime Minister of Kashmir (1937-1943)

Ayyangar's political career gained prominence during his tenure as Prime Minister of Jammu and Kashmir (1937–43).

Government of India

Constituent Assembly of India 
In 1946, Ayyangar was elected to the Constituent Assembly of India, which convened in December 1946 with Jawaharlal Nehru as its president. Ayyangar was appointed to the thirteen-member Drafting Committee that formulated the Indian Constitution.

Kashmir affairs
Soon after the accession of Jammu and Kashmir in October 1947, Nehru appointed Ayyangar as a cabinet minister without portfolio and asked him to look after Kashmir affairs, while Nehru himself held the overall charge for Kashmir. The move caused frictions with the home minister Vallabhbhai Patel, who should have normally been responsible for Kashmir along with all other princely states.

Ayyangar led the delegation representing India in the United Nations over the Kashmir dispute in 1948. In 1952, Prime Minister Nehru appointed him as India's representative in the ongoing negotiations and discussions about Kashmir at the Geneva talks.

Ayyangar was the chief drafter of Article 370 which granted local autonomy to the state of Jammu and Kashmir.

Minister of Railways and Transport
During his tenure as Minister for Railways and Transport from 1948–52, the railways experienced considerable growth and expansion in services and equipment. He was the main architect in the regrouping of the Indian Railways into six zonal systems - Central, Eastern, Northern, North-eastern, Southern, and Western. Under his leadership, the operation of the railways was smooth and productive. The railway budget also reported surplus earnings at this time.

Reorganization of Government
In 1949, he presented his report on the "Reorganization of the Government Machinery" in an effort to streamline government services and maintain efficiency in the public sphere. He recommended the establishment of four standing committees, and, as a result of this report, the Defence Committee, the Economic Committee, the Parliamentary and Legal Affairs Committee, and the Administrative Organization Committee were formed by the Union government.

Death
Ayyangar died in Madras at the age of 71 on 10 February 1953, and was survived by his wife, a son, G. Parthasarathy, who was then Assistant Editor of The Hindu, and a daughter.

Honors
A distinguished administrator and a civil servant, Ayyangar held seven titles until 1947 including the title of Diwan Bahadur, the highest title awarded by a British viceroy. Other titles conferred on him by the British government were a Companion of the Order of the Indian Empire (CIE) in the 1935 Silver Jubilee and Birthday Honours list, a Companion of the Order of the Star of India (CSI) in the 1937 Coronation Honours list and a knighthood in 1941 New Year Honours list.

References

External links

Tamil civil servants
Members of the Constituent Assembly of India
Indian Knights Bachelor
Knights Bachelor
Companions of the Order of the Star of India
Companions of the Order of the Indian Empire
People of the Kashmir conflict
1882 births
1953 deaths
Politicians from Chennai
Permanent Representatives of India to the United Nations
Rajya Sabha members from Tamil Nadu
Dewan Bahadurs
Chief Ministers of Jammu and Kashmir (princely state)
Railway Ministers of India
Defence Ministers of India
Members of the Cabinet of India